Contact Risk is the twelfth album released by DIY home recording pioneer and one-man band R. Stevie Moore.

Track listing

 "Your Dancing Ears" (5:40)
 "Under the Light" (5:14)  
 "I Could Be Your Lover a" (1:00)  
 "Elation Damnation" (3:23) 
 "The Clinch" (2:30)
 "Sponge Bath" (1:00)  
 "Can't Afford No Food" (2:01)  
 "Times Have Changed" (4:44)  
 "Ill (Worst)" (2:46)  
 "You Love Me, Do Something" (4:53) 
 "I Could Be Your Lover b" (:56) 
 "Pledge Your Money" (3:37)
 "You Can't Write a Song" (4:16) 
 "Oil" (8:27) 
 "It's What You Do (It's Not What You Are)" (4:23) 
 "Alecia" (5:48) 
 "I Could Be Your Lover c" (1:06) 
 "I Like to Stay Home" (4:15)
 "No Know" (3:00)
 "Hours of Delight" (1:37)
 "Play Myself Some Music" (3:44)
 "Innocent Mind" (2:57)

External links
RSM's Contact Risk webpage

1993 albums
R. Stevie Moore albums
New Weird America albums